The 1963 William & Mary Indians football team was an American football team that represented the College of William & Mary as a member of the Southern Conference (SoCon) during the 1963 NCAA University Division football season. In their seventh season under head coach Milt Drewer, William & Mary compiled a 4–6 record, with a mark of 4–4 in conference play, placing fifth in the SoCon.

Schedule

NFL Draft selections

References

William and Mary
William & Mary Tribe football seasons
William